Thunnus (Neothunnus) is a subgenus of ray-finned bony fishes in the Thunnini, or tuna, tribe.  More specifically, Neothunnus is a subgenus of the genus Thunnus, also known as the "true tunas".  Neothunnus is sometimes referred to as the yellowfin group, and comprises three species:

subgenus Thunnus (Neothunnus)
 T. albacares (Bonnaterre, 1788) – yellowfin tuna
 T. atlanticus (Lesson, 1831) – blackfin tuna
 T. tonggol (Bleeker, 1851) – longtail tuna

{| class="wikitable"
|-
! style="background-color: #FFFFB7; color:black;" colspan="9"|  Thunnus (Neothunnus) – the yellowfin group of tunas
|-
! Common name
! Scientific name
! Maximumlength
! Commonlength
! Maximumweight
! Maximumage
! Trophiclevel
! Source
! IUCN status
|-
| Blackfin tuna
| T. atlanticus(Lesson, 1831)
| style="text-align:right;"| 
| style="text-align:right;"| 
| style="text-align:right;"| 
| style="text-align:right;"|
| style="text-align:center;"| 4.13
| style="text-align:center;"| 
|  Least concern
|-
| Longtail tuna
| T. tonggol(Bleeker, 1851)
| style="text-align:right;"| 
| style="text-align:right;"| 
| style="text-align:right;"| 
| style="text-align:right;"| 18 years
| style="text-align:center;"| 4.50
| style="text-align:center;"| 
|  Data deficient
|-
| Yellowfin tuna
| T. albacares(Bonnaterre, 1788)
| style="text-align:right;"| 
| style="text-align:right;"| 
| style="text-align:right;"| 
| style="text-align:right;"| 5–9 yrs
| style="text-align:center;"| 4.34
| style="text-align:center;"| 
|  Near threatened
|}

References

Thunnus
Commercial fish
Sport fish
Animal subgenera
Taxa named by Kamakichi Kishinouye